

Coddu Vecchiu is a Nuragic funerary monument located near Arzachena in northern Sardinia, dating from the Bronze Age. The site consists of a stele, stone megaliths and a gallery grave, and is one of the larger Nuragic Giants' graves on the island. The Nuraghe La Prisgiona is located nearby.

History
The site was excavated in 1966 by Editta Castaldi. Among the artifacts recovered were pans, bowls and plates with comb decoration, as well as vases with bent necks, and vase fragments of the early Nuragic Bonnanaro culture, suggesting the monument was constructed early in the Nuragic period c. 1800–1600 BC.

Coddu Vecchiu appears to have originally consisted of a cist, which was expanded during the middle Bronze Age c. 1800–1600 BC and covered with a gallery grave and the ornate stele portal stone and megaliths characteristic of Giants' graves. It has been hypothesized that the semicircular arrangement of the stones may have been an attempt to harness the telluric current of the granite for rejuvenative purposes.

The upper portion of the stele was once taken by a local farmer and used as a plow, but it was soon recovered and restored to its place in the monument. Coddu Vecchiu is among the most well-preserved of Giants' graves, and continues to be a popular tourist attraction.

Notes
 The monument is visible on Google map satellite view and on street view.

Gallery

References

External links
 Arzachena, tomba di giganti di Coddu Vecchiu

Buildings and structures in Sardinia
Megalithic monuments in Italy
Tourist attractions in Sardinia
Archaeological sites in Sardinia
Nuraghe